Käfertal is a borough (Stadtbezirk) of Mannheim, Baden-Württemberg, Germany in the Rhine-Neckar metropolitan region which is divided into the quarters Käfertal-Mitte, Speckweggebiet, Käfertal-Süd, Sonnenschein and Franklin. It has a population of 26,446 people as of December 31, 2019.

Geography 
Käfertal is located in the northeast of Mannheim. The neighboring districts are Vogelstang, Feudenheim, Wohlgelegen, and Waldhof. In the northeast is the city of Viernheim (Bergstraße district).

Gallery

Literature 
 Lorenz Klingert: Festbuch zur Siebenjahrhundert-Feier der ehemaligen Gemeinde Käfertal 1227–1927. Mannheim 1927.
 Günter Bertschmann: Käfertal: 750 Jahre Käfertal 1227–1977. Mannheim 1977.

References

External links 
 Käfertal-Portal Official website (in German)

Mannheim